Wilson Creek is a  long 2nd order tributary to the Trent River in Craven County, North Carolina.

Course
Wilson Creek rises about 2 miles west of New Bern, North Carolina and then flows south to join the Trent River at Trent Woods.

Watershed
Wilson Creek drains  of area, receives about 54.5 in/year of precipitation, has a wetness index of 578.57, and is about 9% forested.

See also
List of rivers of North Carolina

References

Rivers of North Carolina
Rivers of Craven County, North Carolina